Joli Jászai (21 May 1907 – 26 September 2008) was a Hungarian actress and entertainer. She began her film career relatively late in life.

Jászai was born in Rábatamási, Austria-Hungary, in what is now the Republic of Hungary, on 21 May 1907. She died in Piliscsaba, Hungary, on 26 September 2008, at the age of 101.

Filmography
 Szerelem utolsó vérig (2002) – Gizike néni
 „A Szórád-ház” (1997) TV – Öregasszony
 Sztracsatella (1996) – Borzsa
 Édes Emma, drága Böbe – vázlatok, aktok (1992)
 Szerelmes szívek (1991) – Timi nagymamája
 Napló apámnak, anyámnak (1990)
 Ismeretlen ismerős (1989) – Találttárgyak őrzője
 Szerelem második vérig (1988) – Mamó
 Hol volt, hol nem volt (1987) – idős nő
 Szerelem első vérig (1986) – Gizike néni, Ágota nagyanyja
 Csók, Anyu! (1986)
 Mamiblu (1986)

External links
 
 FN: Joli Jászai 

1907 births
2008 deaths
People from Győr-Moson-Sopron County
Hungarian television actresses
Hungarian film actresses
Hungarian centenarians
Women centenarians